"Phases" is a song by Finnish singer Alma and American rapper French Montana. The song was written by Alma, Charli XCX, French Montana, Noonie Bao, and Sasha Sloan and produced by Charlie Handsome, Rex Kudo and Styalz Fuego. The song was released as a single on through PME Records on September 21, 2017. The music video for the single was directed by Charli XCX. The video was nominated in the category of Music Video of the Year at the 2017 Emma Awards.

Background
Alma released her debut extended play Dye My Hair in 2016. In 2017, she was featured on Sub Focus' single "Don't You Feel It" and Martin Solveig's single "All Stars". "Phases" was released following Alma's successful solo single "Chasing Highs". Alma spoke of the song's recording process with Charli XCX, saying "We finished the song in Finland and it was very nice for us to hang out there and finish the whole track there. It’s just about teenage phases. When you’re getting drunk Friday and think you like someone, Saturday you wake up like “no” and sometimes you hurt someone else’s feelings".

Track listing

Charts

References

2017 singles
2017 songs
Alma (Finnish singer) songs
French Montana songs
Songs written by French Montana
Songs written by Alma (Finnish singer)
Songs written by Charli XCX
Songs written by Noonie Bao
Songs written by Sasha Alex Sloan
Virgin Records singles